The 2003 Orlando mayoral special election was held on February 4 and February 25, 2003 to elect the mayor of Orlando, Florida.  Buddy Dyer was elected to serve the remainder of Glenda Hood's term.

Since no candidate obtained a majority in the first-round, a runoff was held between the top-two finishers.

Municipal elections in Orlando and Orange County are non-partisan.

Results

First round

Runoff

References

2003
2003 Florida elections
2003 United States mayoral elections
2000s in Orlando, Florida
United States mayoral special elections
Florida special elections